Ptereleotris evides, the Blackfin dartfish, is a species of dartfish native to the Indian Ocean and the western Pacific Ocean. This species can reach a length of  TL. It can also be found in the aquarium trade.

References

External links
 

evides
Fish described in 1925
Taxa named by David Starr Jordan